Grey-hooded bunting may refer to two different species of birds:

 Chestnut-eared bunting, found from northern Pakistan to Korea and Japan
 Grey-necked bunting, found from eastern Turkey to north-western China